Dwyer Hill may refer to several different things, including:

 Dwyer Hill, Ontario, a rural community southwest of the city of Ottawa.
 Dwyer Hill Road (Ottawa), a road.